Walter Alfred Smith (1874 – 14 November 1958) was an English footballer who made 90 appearances in the Football League for Lincoln City. He played as an inside left.

Born in Lincoln, Lincolnshire, Smith played local football in the Lincoln area before joining Lincoln City. He scored 23 goals from 99 appearances in senior competition, the last of which was at the end of the 1902–03 season. He joined Second Division club Small Heath, but never made a competitive appearance, and went on to play for Midland League club Newark, Southern League clubs Brighton & Hove Albion, Norwich City and Southend United, and other non-league teams. Smith died in Leigh-on-Sea, Essex, in 1958.

References

1874 births
1958 deaths
Sportspeople from Lincoln, England
English footballers
Association football inside forwards
Lincoln City F.C. players
Grantham Avenue F.C. players
Birmingham City F.C. players
Newark F.C. players
Brighton & Hove Albion F.C. players
Norwich City F.C. players
Southend United F.C. players
Sutton Junction F.C. players
Mansfield Mechanics F.C. players
Mansfield Town F.C. players
English Football League players
Midland Football League players
Southern Football League players
Date of birth missing